Dian Hanson (born November 2, 1951) is an American magazine and book editor.

Career
Hanson began her publishing career as an American pornographic magazine editor, historian, and occasional model, helping found the 1970s hardcore journal Puritan, then moving on to Partner, OUI, Adult Cinema Review, Outlaw Biker and Big Butt, among others. She was most famously the editor of Juggs and Leg Show sexual fetish magazines from 1987–2001.

Since 2001 Hanson has held the position of Sexy Book editor for art book publisher, Taschen, based in Cologne, Germany, in which capacity she writes or edits all the sexually oriented titles for the company. Recent books include Vanessa del Rio: 50 Years of Slightly Slutty Behavior and The Big Penis Book. In an interview with magazine The Believer, Hanson speaks of her introduction to Benedikt Taschen in the early 1990s, and how she came to work for the publisher: "I was editing Leg Show and Juggs, and Benedikt Taschen was my biggest German fan. He contacted me in 1993 or ‘94 and wanted to meet. He would come to New York and take me out to dinner and say, 'When are you going to work for me?' I would say, 'Never. I want to keep doing what I’m doing. I love pornography.' I didn’t mean to be a tease. I was just being honest. But he took it as a great challenge...The magazine field had been declining since 1997, and my publisher died in 2000. I love magazines, but I knew that change would come at some point. I had always known that Benedikt was going to be my future."

Hanson published her edited erotic photography work The Big Butt Book in 2010, tracing the cultural history of the buttocks.

References

General references
 "The Soho Love Goddess", By  Marshall Sella, January 31, 2000, New York magazine. Retrieved 2007-08-08.
 "Editing by desire", Folio: The Magazine for Magazine Management, November 1, 1996, by Michael Kaplan. Retrieved 2007-08-08.
  "Dian Hanson", by Ian Gray, Trax.it. Retrieved 2007-08-08.
 "Crumb" , film review by Roger Ebert, November 20, 2005, Chicago Sun Times
 "Dian Hanson", by Michelle Golden, Index Magazine, 2002. Also at Index Magazine site Retrieved 2007-08-08.
 "When nudists swung" Interview by David Bowman about Hanson's book Naked as a Jaybird, 2003-04-11, Salon.com. Retrieved 2007-08-08.
 "The Reigning Queen", by Bob Massey, Baltimore City Paper, September 27, 2006. Retrieved 2007-11-08.

External links 
 

1951 births
Living people
American pornographers
American magazine editors
Women magazine editors
American book editors